The Spectre Within is the second studio album by progressive metal band Fates Warning, released in October 1985 through Metal Blade Records. It has been reissued three times: first as a double album together with Night on Bröcken (1984) in 1992, followed by a remastered edition in 1994, and again in 2002 with four bonus tracks as well as new cover art.

Critical reception

Robert Taylor at AllMusic awarded The Spectre Within two stars out of five, saying that "Metal fans may enjoy this more than Night on Bröcken, especially 'Pirates of the Underground' and 'The Apparition', but there is very little, if anything, for the progressive fan." Trey Spencer at Sputnikmusic gave the album a similarly lukewarm review, deeming it "for die-hard fans only". Some criticism was directed at John Arch's vocals, which were described as "slightly irritating due to the unchanging high-pitched nature of his voice", as well as the dated riffs and production. For new fans of Fates Warning, Spencer instead recommended their 1986 follow-up Awaken the Guardian as a better starting point.

In contrast, Jeff Wagner in his Mean Deviation (2010: 56) book wrote that The Spectre Within "set Fates Warning apart from just about everyone else in the metal underground, although parallels could be drawn to Danish band Mercyful Fate, an early influence on [guitarist Jim Matheos]". Wagner also stressed that the album was "darker and more complex than even Iron Maiden or Queensrÿche, and it handled its fantasy imagery intelligently, passing over the clichéd traps of wizards, dragons, and ham-fisted, second-rate riffs".

Track listing

Personnel
John Arch – vocals, arrangement, producer
Victor Arduini – guitar, arrangement, producer
Jim Matheos – guitar, arrangement, producer
Jim Arch – keyboard, arrangement
Steve Zimmerman – drums, arrangement, producer
Joe DiBiase – bass, arrangement, producter

Production
Brian Slagel – producer
Bill Metoyer – engineering
Carmine Rizzo – engineering
Brad Vance – remastering (reissue)
Third Image – artwork

References

External links
Fates Warning - Spectre Within at Metal Reviews

Fates Warning albums
1985 albums
Metal Blade Records albums